Christopher Frank Kearton, Baron Kearton, (17 February 1911 – 2 July 1992), usually known as Frank Kearton, was a British life peer in the House of Lords. He was also a scientist and industrialist and former Chancellor of the University of Bath.

Early life and education

Kearton was born to Christopher John Kearton, a bricklayer, and Lilian (née Hancock) in Congleton, Cheshire, although the family moved to Tunstall in the Potteries not long after his birth. He completed his secondary education at Hanley High School before going up to St John's College, Oxford in 1929 as an open exhibitioner to read chemistry. He graduated with a First in 1933 although he did not apply for the promotion of his BA to an MA until 1959.

Appointments and awards

Kearton was made an honorary Doctor of Science (DSc) by the University of Bath in 1966 when Lord Hinton was appointed the university's first Chancellor. Kearton himself was appointed Chancellor of the university in 1980 and, according to Sir Norman Wooding, was a "notably active member of the University." He was still in office as Chancellor upon his death in 1991.

 President, Society of Chemical Industry (1972–1974)
 Chairman, Royal Society for the Prevention of Accidents (1973–1980)
 Chairman and Chief Executive, British National Oil Corporation (1975–1979)
 Chairman, British Association for the Advancement of Science (1978–1979)
 Chairman, Association of Special Libraries (1980–1982)

His awards include:

 Officer of the Order of the British Empire (1946)
 Fellow, Royal Society (1961)
 Honorary Fellow, St John's College, Oxford (1965)
 Companion of The Textile Institute (1965)
 Knighted (1966) 
 Honorary Doctor of Science (DSc), University of Bath (1966)
 Honorary Fellow, UMIST (1966)
 Honorary Doctor of Laws (LLD), University of Leeds (1966)
 Honorary Fellow, Institution of Chemical Engineers (1968)
 Created Baron Kearton, of Whitchurch in the County of Buckingham (5 February 1970)
 Honorary Doctor of Science (DSc), Aston University (1970)
 Honorary Doctor of Science (DSc), University of Reading (1970)
 Honorary Doctor of Science (DSc), Keele University (1970)
 Fellow (FRSA), Royal Society of Arts (1970)
 Fellow, Society of Dyers and Colourists (1974)
 Honorary Doctor of Science (DSc), University of Ulster (1975)
 Fellow, Imperial College, London (1976)
 Grand Officiale, Order of Merit, Italy (1977)
 Doctor of Civil Law (DCL), University of Oxford (1978)
 Doctor of the University (DUniv), Heriot-Watt University (1979)
 Companion of the British Institute of Management (1980)
 Honorary Doctor of Laws (LLD), University of Strathclyde (1981)
 Honorary Doctor of Laws (LLD), University of Bristol (1988)

Personal life

Three years after leaving Oxford, on 16 April 1936, he married Kathleen Agnes (née Kay) whom he had met when at school through playing tennis. She had completed a French degree at Bedford College, London and was a teacher at Morecambe Grammar School. The couple later had two sons and two daughters.

Lord Kearton died from cancer on 2 July 1992 at Stoke Mandeville Hospital in Buckinghamshire and was buried at Whitchurch. He left an estate, according to probate of 14 August 1992, of £337,670.

References

1911 births
1992 deaths
People from Congleton
British scientists
Alumni of St John's College, Oxford
Knights Bachelor
Chancellors of the University of Bath
Fellows of the Royal Society
Life peers created by Elizabeth II
Deaths from cancer in England
Presidents of the British Science Association
Officers of the Order of the British Empire
Grand Officers of the Order of Merit of the Italian Republic
British industrialists
Manhattan Project people